is a Japanese television jidaigeki or period drama, that was broadcast in 1965 and 1998. It is based on Ryōtarō Shiba's novel of the same title and Moeyo Ken. It depicts the stories of the Shinsengumi.

Synopsis
The arrival of Matthew Perry's Black Ships rudely awakens Japan from 300 years of isolation from the world. Men set their eyes beyond Japan and begin to demand change in society. The old clashes with the new, and thus begins an age of turmoil. Amidst this confusion, one group remains true to the old ways and risks their lives to preserve the traditional shogunate system. Led by their charismatic captain, Kondo Isami, the Shinsengumi uphold the code of honor of the samurai. Tales abound of the feats of men like Kondo, Hijikata Toshizo and Okita Soji. In general, the passion and glory of these men who lived during these turbulent times in Japanese history are explored.

Cast
Tetsuya Watari as Kondō Isami
Hiroaki Murakami as Hijikata Toshizō
 Shunsuke Nakamura as Okita Sōji
 Ren Osugi as Yamazaki Susumu
 Daijiro Tsutsumi as Nagakura Shinpachi
 Hiroyuki Konishi as Harada Sanosuke
 Takuji Fukae as Saitō Hajime
Ben Hiura as Inoue Genzaburō
Hiroshi Katsuno as Kido Takayoshi
 Miki Sakai as Otaka
Tōru Minegishi as Itō Kashitarō

Other adaptations
Shinsengumi Keppūroku (1965–66) was aired on NET was started by Asahi Kurizuka.

References

External links
 

1998 Japanese television series debuts
1990s drama television series
Jidaigeki television series
Television shows based on Japanese novels